Alessandro Santopadre (born 4 October 1998) is an Italian football player who plays as a goalkeeper.

Club career

Perugia
He started playing for Perugia Under-19 squad in the 2015–16 season and made occasional bench appearances as a back-up goalkeeper for the senior squad.

Atalanta

Loan back to Perugia
On 24 January 2017, he signed with Atalanta, who immediately loaned him back to Perugia until June 2018. He became the primary backup goalkeeper for Perugia in the 2017–18 Serie B season, but did not appear on the field.

Loan to Paganese
For the 2018–19 season, he joined Paganese on loan.

He made his Serie C debut for Paganese on 17 November 2018 in a game against Cavese.

Loans to Rimini and Potenza
On 26 July 2019 he moved to Serie C club Rimini on loan. On 31 January 2020 he joined Potenza on loan. The loan to Potenza was extended for the 2020–21 season.

Imolese
On 27 August 2021, he signed a one-year deal with Imolese.

References

External links
 

1998 births
Living people
Footballers from Rome
Italian footballers
Association football goalkeepers
Serie C players
A.C. Perugia Calcio players
Atalanta B.C. players
Paganese Calcio 1926 players
Rimini F.C. 1912 players
Potenza Calcio players
Imolese Calcio 1919 players